Albert Edward "Abbie" Cox (July 16, 1902 – May 10, 1985) was a Canadian professional ice hockey goaltender. Cox played a total of five games in the National Hockey League for the Montreal Maroons, New York Americans, Detroit Red Wings and Montreal Canadiens between 1930 and 1936. The rest of his career, which lasted from 1923 to 1937, was spent in various minor leagues.

Playing career
He was born in London, Ontario. Cox played junior hockey in Ottawa and Iroquois Falls, winning the Memorial Cup in 1923. Cox graduated to senior hockey in 1923, playing first with the New Haven Eagles and then the Boston Maples. Cox signed with the New York Hockey Club of the USAHA in 1925 but was ruled ineligible to play in amateur play and was suspended for the season. Cox became a professional in 1926 with the Springfield Indians, then an affiliate of the New York Rangers. Cox played two seasons with Springfield, then signed with the Montreal Maroons organization. He played one game with the Maroons in the 1929–30 season, but played mostly for the minor league Windsor Bulldogs. Cox would spend the rest of his career mainly in the minor leagues, but played occasional games in the NHL. He played two games in 1933–34 for the Detroit Red Wings, and one for the New York Americans. He played one game in the 1935–36 season for the Montreal Canadiens. Cox retired after the 1936–37 season. Cox continued in hockey as a linesman.

Career statistics

Regular season and playoffs

External links

1902 births
1985 deaths
Canadian ice hockey goaltenders
Detroit Olympics (IHL) players
Detroit Red Wings players
Ice hockey people from Ontario
Kansas City Greyhounds players
Montreal Canadiens players
Montreal Maroons players
New Haven Bears players
New York Americans players
Philadelphia Ramblers players
Pittsburgh Yellow Jackets (IHL) players
Quebec Castors players
Sportspeople from London, Ontario
Springfield Indians players
Windsor Bulldogs (CPHL) players
Canadian expatriate ice hockey players in the United States